Bjørnar is a given name. Notable people with the name include:

Bjørnar Andersen (born 1978), Norwegian refrigerator mechanic and competitive dog musher
Bjørnar Håkensmoen (born 1969), the head coach of the Norwegian cross-country skiing team at the 2006 Winter Olympics
Bjørnar Holmvik (born 1985), Norwegian football defender
Bjørnar Johannessen (born 1977), Norwegian football midfielder
Bjørnar Moxnes (born 1981), Norwegian politician and leader of the Red Party
Bjørnar Neteland (born 1991), alpine skier
Bjørnar Valstad (born 1967), Norwegian orienteering athlete, winner of 4 World Orienteering Championships gold medals

See also
Arna-Bjørnar Fotball, Norwegian football club from Arna, Bergen
Bjorn

Norwegian masculine given names